Ukraine participated in the ninth Winter Paralympics in Turin, Italy. 

Ukraine entered 12 athletes in the following sports:

Nordic skiing: 6 male, 6 female

Medalists

See also
2006 Winter Paralympics
Ukraine at the 2006 Winter Olympics

External links
Torino 2006 Paralympic Games
International Paralympic Committee

2006
Nations at the 2006 Winter Paralympics
Winter Paralympics